The 2022 Challenger Banque Nationale de Drummondville was a professional tennis tournament played on indoor hard courts. It was the 15th edition of the tournament and part of the 2022 ATP Challenger Tour. It took place in Drummondville, Canada between November 14 and 20, 2022.

Singles main-draw entrants

Seeds

1 Rankings are as of November 7, 2022.

Other entrants
The following players received wildcards into the singles main draw:
 Taha Baadi
 Justin Boulais
 Marko Stakusic

The following player received entry into the singles main draw using a protected ranking:
  Julian Ocleppo

The following player received entry into the singles main draw as an alternate:
  Malek Jaziri

The following players received entry from the qualifying draw:
  Liam Draxl
  Maks Kaśnikowski
  Joshua Lapadat
  Max Hans Rehberg
  Roy Smith
  Kai Wehnelt

The following player received entry as a lucky loser:
  Constantin Frantzen
  Roko Horvat

Champions

Singles

 Vasek Pospisil def.  Michael Mmoh 7–6(7–5), 4–6, 6–4.

Doubles

 Julian Cash /  Henry Patten def.  Arthur Fery /  Giles Hussey 6–3, 6–3.

References

2022 ATP Challenger Tour
2022
2022 in Canadian tennis
November 2022 sports events in Canada